Srimanta Dutta Chaudhury (IAST: Śrīmanta Datta Caudhurī) (1608–1640) is the founder of the royal family of Dinajpur, then in Bengal.

Dinajpur Royal Palace 
It is said that two decades prior to the rule of Mughal Emperor Akbar, a King named Ganesh had gifted the land of Dinajpur to one of his nearest relatives, Kashi, who had no inclination towards worldly possessions & consequently became a sanyasi.

Kashi donated the entire Dinajpur Estate to his disciple Srimanta Dutta Chaudhury, who became the patriarch of royal family of Dinajpur. He had three sons- Rajib Lochan, Ramchand and Biswambar. It is Rajib Lochan, who accompanied him and died early. Since his son died prematurely, Srimanta was succeeded by his daughter's son Sukdev Roy, who extended his estate considerably beyond what he inherited from his maternal grandfather. Sukdev was conferred the title of "Raja" in 1677, apparently by Emperor Aurangzeb.

References 

Bengali Hindus
1608 births
1640 deaths